KUMM (89.7 FM, "U-90") is an American non-commercial educational radio station licensed to serve the community of Morris, the county seat of Stevens County, Minnesota. Established in 1970, the station is owned and operated by the University of Minnesota Morris.

Programming
KUMM broadcasts a college radio/alternative rock music format to the campus and the greater Stevens County, Minnesota, area. The station is a member of Minnesota's Independent Public Radio network. The station also broadcasts programming produced by University of Minnesota Morris students.

History
KUMM began licensed broadcast operations on September 17, 1972, with 10 watts of effective radiated power (ERP) from an antenna  in height above average terrain. The station was assigned the call sign "KUMM" by the Federal Communications Commission (FCC).

The station began licensed operation at the new parameters on December 15, 1983.

In September 2002, KUMM applied for a new construction permit to further expand the station's coverage area. A 2009 amendment to that application reduced the requested power to 700 watts. KUMM began licensed operation at these new parameters on October 15, 2009.

References

External links
KUMM official website

Radio stations in Minnesota
College radio stations in Minnesota
Independent Public Radio
Stevens County, Minnesota
Radio stations established in 1970
University of Minnesota Morris
1970 establishments in Minnesota